Sontsivka, known as Krasne from 1927 to 2016, is a village in Pokrovsk Raion of Donetsk Oblast in Ukraine.

History
The village, founded in 1785, was initially in the Bakhmutsky Uyezd of the Yekaterinoslav Governorate in the Russian Empire and was named after its owner Dmitri Dmitrievich Sontsov. In the Soviet Union, it was renamed Krasne in 1927 and kept the name until it was renamed Sontsivka in 2016 as part of decommunization in Ukraine. In 1967, a museum was opened in Sontsivka in memory of the native composer Prokofiev and in 1968, the local music school was named after him.

Demographics
Native language as of the Ukrainian Census of 2001:
 Ukrainian 92.45%
 Russian 7.42%

Notable people
The composer Sergei Prokofiev (1891–1953) was born in Sontsivka.

References

Villages in Pokrovsk Raion